Josip Broz Tito Monument is a monument in Kumanovo, North Macedonia honoring former Marshal of Yugoslavia Josip Broz Tito. The monument is at the northwest side of the Josip Broz Tito Square.

See also
 Socialist Federative Republic of Yugoslavia

References

Buildings and structures in Kumanovo
Cultural depictions of Josip Broz Tito
Monuments and memorials in North Macedonia
Statues of presidents
Statues of military officers